Nellie Navette (1865–3 August 1936) was a well-known British music hall serio-comic performer of the late Victorian era. Famous as a pantomime Principal boy, comedienne, dancer and singer, she made frequent appearances at such venues as the East End Pavilion Theatre and the Tivoli Theatre of Varieties on The Strand where she appeared alongside such  entertainers as Lottie Collins, George Robey, Tom Costello and Marie Lloyd, among others.

In 1889 she appeared in the pantomime Little Jack and the Big Beanstalk at the Prince of Wales Theatre in Liverpool. In 1893 she introduced her new ‘Floral Electric Dance’ which she first performed at the Alhambra Theatre in Leicester Square in London with "kaleidoscopic effects" by Mr. A.L. Fyfe and specially written music by Georges Jacobi,

In April 1893 she appeared at the opening night performance of the West London Theatre of Varieties in London, while in 1895 she introduced the song and accompanying dance The Coon's Serenade. In 1900 she was on the bill at the Tivoli Theatre in Birmingham.

Nellie Navette died in August 1936 aged 71 and is buried in Streatham Park Cemetery in London.

See also
 List of dancers

References

External links
Nellie Navette on Find a Grave
Portraits of Nellie Navette on the National Portrait Gallery website

1865 births
1936 deaths
Music hall performers
Vaudeville performers
English women comedians
English women singers
English female dancers
20th-century British dancers
19th-century British dancers
Women of the Victorian era
Burials at Streatham Park Cemetery